Adrian Peter Metcalfe  (2 March 1942 – 2 July 2021) was a British athlete and broadcaster. He set a UK record for the 400m in 1961 and won silver relay medals at the 1962 British Empire and Commonwealth Games, the 1962 European Athletics Championships and the 1964 Summer Olympics. He moved into broadcasting, first as a commentator, then as head of sport at Channel 4 and then at Eurosport. He held roles at the International Olympic Committee and International Association of Athletics Federations and was appointed an Officer of the Order of the British Empire (OBE) for services to sport in 2001.

Early life 

Adrian Peter Metcalfe was born on 2 March 1942 in Bradford to Hylton and Cora Metcalfe and brought up in Leeds, along with his sister Lynne. His father was a manager at Yorkshire Bank and his mother a teacher. He attended The Brunts School after his father became manager of the Midland Bank in Mansfield, and went on to study English at Magdalen College, Oxford, where he was also president of the athletics club.

Athletics career

Metcalfe won an English Schools athletics title as a schoolboy. In 1961, he won the 100, 220 and 440 yards in record times in the Varsity match and broke Robbie Brightwell's UK 400m record with a time of 45.7 seconds. 
He was a relay silver medallist with England at the 1962 British Empire and Commonwealth Games in Perth, Australia, and with Great Britain at the 1962 European Championships in Belgrade, Yugoslavia.
Metcalfe competed for Great Britain in the 1964 Summer Olympics held in Tokyo in the 4 × 400 m relay where he won the silver medal with his teammates Tim Graham, John Cooper and Robbie Brightwell.

Business career

Metcalfe began working in television, commentating on athletics for ITV, before joining Channel 4 where he was head of sport, introducing lesser-known foreign sports such as American football and Sumo to British viewers. He joined the pan-European sports channel Eurosport in 1989 and then Tyne Tees TV before becoming an executive producer with the International Olympic Committee Olympic Broadcasting Services. In 1998, Metcalfe invested in a web-based project, worldsport.com, working with a large number of international sports federations but the project failed. He also held roles with the International Association of Athletics Federations, serving on marketing and television commissions until 2011.

Personal life 
Metcalfe was married twice with two children and three step-children.

He lived in France with his second wife, before moving to the Sunrise of Winchester retirement home in Winchester in 2011.

He died on 2 July 2021, aged 79. A painting depicting Metcalfe's life and sporting achievements painted by his sister Lynne, who discovered art therapy after having a stroke, was donated to the Sunrise of Winchester retirement home and is now displayed there as a memorial to Metcalfe.

References

External links 
 

1942 births
2021 deaths
Sportspeople from Bradford
British male sprinters
English male sprinters
Olympic athletes of Great Britain
Olympic silver medallists for Great Britain
Athletes (track and field) at the 1964 Summer Olympics
European Athletics Championships medalists
Commonwealth Games medallists in athletics
Commonwealth Games gold medallists for England
Athletes (track and field) at the 1962 British Empire and Commonwealth Games
Medalists at the 1964 Summer Olympics
Olympic silver medalists in athletics (track and field)
Universiade medalists in athletics (track and field)
Officers of the Order of the British Empire
Universiade gold medalists for Great Britain
Medalists at the 1963 Summer Universiade
Medallists at the 1962 British Empire and Commonwealth Games